The space of gong culture in the Vietnam Highlands is a region in Central Vietnam that is home to cultures that value gongs. It spreads in the Tây Nguyên (Central Highlands) provinces of Kon Tum, Gia Lai, Đắk Lắk, Đắk Nông, and Lâm Đồng. The UNESCO recognized it as a Masterpiece of the Intangible Heritage of Humanity on November 25, 2005.

The gong culture sees gongs as a privileged connection between men and the supernatural, where each gong houses a deity whose power corresponds to the gong's age. It has been strongly affected by economic and social transformations that disrupted the traditional transfer of knowledge and stripped the gongs of their spiritual significance.

References

External links
UNESCO recognizes space of Gong
Official website of Central Highland's Gong Culture Festival

Culture of Vietnamese Central-Highlands
Masterpieces of the Oral and Intangible Heritage of Humanity
Vietnamese music
Gongs
Kon Tum province
Gia Lai province
Đắk Lắk province
Đắk Nông province
Lâm Đồng province